The Belmont Bruins men's basketball statistical leaders are individual statistical leaders of the Belmont Bruins men's basketball program in various categories, including points, rebounds, assists, steals, and blocks. Within those areas, the lists identify single-game, single-season, and career leaders. The Bruins represent Belmont University in the NCAA Division I Missouri Valley Conference.

Belmont began competing in intercollegiate basketball in 1952 as a member of the National Association of Intercollegiate Athletics (NAIA), and did not join the NCAA until the 1996–97 season.  While the NCAA did not officially record assists as a stat until the 1983–84 season, and blocks and steals until the 1985–86 season, the NAIA has recorded these statistics over a noticeably longer time frame. Belmont's record books includes players in these stats before these seasons. These lists are updated through the end of the 2020–21 season.

Scoring

Rebounds

Assists

Steals

Blocks

Footnotes

References

Lists of college basketball statistical leaders by team
Statistical